Julius Watkins (October 10, 1921 – April 4, 1977) was an American jazz musician who played French horn. Described by AllMusic as "virtually the father of the jazz French horn", Watkins won the Down Beat critics poll in 1960 and 1961 for Miscellaneous Instrument.

Life and career
Watkins was born in Detroit, Michigan, United States. He began playing the French horn when he was nine years old. Watkins began his career in jazz playing the trumpet in the Ernie Fields Orchestra from 1943 to 1946. By the late 1940s, he had played some French horn solos on recording sessions led by Kenny Clarke and Babs Gonzales. After moving to New York City, Watkins studied for three years at the Manhattan School of Music. He started appearing in small-group jazz sessions, including two led by Thelonious Monk, featuring on "Friday the 13th" on the album Thelonious Monk and Sonny Rollins (1954).

Watkins recorded with many other jazz musicians, including John Coltrane, Freddie Hubbard, Charles Mingus, Miles Davis and Gil Evans, Phil Woods, Clark Terry, Johnny Griffin, Randy Weston, and with the Jazz Composer's Orchestra. He co-led, with Charlie Rouse, the group Les Jazz Modes from 1956 to 1959, and he toured with Quincy Jones and his band from 1959 to 1961.

In 1969, Watkins played French horn for the beat poet Allen Ginsberg's album Songs of Innocence and Experience (1970), a musical adaptation of William Blake's poetry collection of the same name.

Suffering from diabetes, liver and kidney problems, and chronic alcoholism, Watkins died from a heart attack in Short Hills, New Jersey, at the age of 55.

From 1994 to 1998, an annual Julius Watkins Jazz Horn Festival was held in New York, beginning at the Knitting Factory,) honoring his legacy. After an eleven-year break, another Julius Watkins Festival was held on October 3, 2009, in Seattle, Washington, at Cornish College of the Arts. On September 29, 2012, the seventh Julius Watkins Jazz Horn Festival was held at Virginia Commonwealth University in Richmond, Virginia.

Discography

As leader/co-leader 
 Julius Watkins Sextet, Vol 1 & 2 (Blue Note, 1954, 1955)
 French Horns for My Lady (Phillips, 1962)
With Charlie Rouse as Les Jazz Modes/The Jazz Modes
Jazzville Vol. 1 (Dawn, 1956) - shared LP with Gene Quill-Dick Sherman Quintet
Les Jazz Modes (Dawn, 1956)
Mood in Scarlet (Dawn, 1956)
The Most Happy Fella (Atlantic, 1958)
The Jazz Modes (Atlantic, 1959)
With Jazz Contemporaries (George Coleman, Clifford Jordan, Harold Mabern, Larry Ridley, Keno Duke)
Reasons in Tonality (Strata-East, 1972)

As sideman
With Manny Albam
Jazz Goes to the Movies (Impulse!, 1962)
With Benny Bailey
Big Brass (Candid, 1960)
With Art Blakey
Golden Boy (Colpix, 1964)
With Kenny Burrell
Guitar Forms (Verve, 1965)
With Billy Byers
Impressions of Duke Ellington (Mercury, 1961)
With Donald Byrd
Jazz Lab (Columbia, 1957) - with Gigi Gryce
Modern Jazz Perspective (Columbia, 1957) - with Gigi Gryce
With John Coltrane
Africa/Brass (Impulse!, 1961)
The Africa/Brass Sessions, Volume 2 (Impulse!, 1961 [1974])
With Tadd Dameron
The Magic Touch (Riverside, 1962)
With Miles Davis
Porgy and Bess (Columbia, 1959)
Miles Davis at Carnegie Hall (Columbia, 1961)
Quiet Nights (Columbia, 1963)
With Billy Eckstein
At Basin Street East (EmArcy, 1961) with Quincy Jones
With Gil Evans
New Bottle Old Wine (World Pacific, 1958)
The Individualism of Gil Evans (Verve, 1964)
Blues in Orbit (Enja, 1971)
With Art Farmer
Brass Shout (United Artists, 1959) 
With Curtis Fuller and Hampton Hawes
Curtis Fuller and Hampton Hawes with French Horns (Status, 1957 [1962])
With Dizzy Gillespie
Gillespiana (Verve, 1960)
With Allen Ginsberg
Songs of Innocence and Experience (MGM, 1970)
With Benny Golson
Benny Golson's New York Scene (Contemporary, 1957)
With Johnny Griffin
Change of Pace (Riverside, 1961)
With Gigi Gryce
Nica's Tempo (Signal, 1955)
With Jimmy Heath
The Quota (Riverside, 1961)
Triple Threat (Riverside, 1962)
Swamp Seed (Riverside, 1963)
With Freddie Hubbard
The Body & the Soul (Impulse!, 1963)
With Milt Jackson
Meet Milt Jackson (Savoy, 1949)
Roll 'Em Bags (Savoy, 1949)
For Someone I Love (Riverside, 1963)
With The Jazz Composer's Orchestra 
The Jazz Composer's Orchestra (JCOA 1968)
With Quincy Jones
The Birth of a Band! (Mercury, 1959)
The Great Wide World of Quincy Jones (Mercury, 1959)
Q Live in Paris Circa 1960 (Quest, 1960 [1996])
The Birth of a Band! Vol. 2 (Mercury, 1959-60 [1984])
I Dig Dancers (Mercury, 1960)
Around the World (Mercury, 1961)
Newport '61 (Mercury, 1961)
The Great Wide World Of Quincy Jones: Live! (Mercury, 1961 [1984])
The Quintessence (Impulse!, 1962)
Big Band Bossa Nova (Mercury, 1962)
Quincy Jones Plays Hip Hits (Mercury, 1963)
Quincy Plays for Pussycats (Mercury, 1959-65 [1965])
With Thad Jones and Mel Lewis
Consummation (Solid State, 1970)
Suite for Pops (Horizon, 1975)
New Life (Horizon, 1976)
With Beverly Kenney
Come Swing with Me (Roost, 1956)
With Stan Kenton
Cuban Fire! (Capitol Records, 1956)
With Roland Kirk
Left & Right (Atlantic, 1968)
With Michel Legrand
Michel Legrand Big Band Plays Richard Rogers (Phillips, 1963)
With the Manhattan Jazz All-Stars
Swinging Guys and Dolls (Columbia, 1959)
With Herbie Mann
The Herbie Mann String Album (Atlantic, 1967)
With Cal Massey
Blues to Coltrane (Candid, 1961)
With Mat Mathews
The Modern Art of Jazz by Mat Mathews (Dawn, 1956) 
4 French Horns plus Rhythm (Elektra, 1958)
With Charles McPherson
Today's Man (Mainstream, 1973)
With Gil Mellé
Gil's Guests (Prestige, 1963)
With Charles Mingus
Music Written for Monterey 1965 (Jazz Workshop, 1965)
Let My Children Hear Music (Columbia, 1972)
With Blue Mitchell
A Sure Thing (Riverside, 1962)
With Thelonious Monk
Monk (Prestige, 1954)
Thelonious Monk and Sonny Rollins (Prestige, 1954)
With David Newman
The Many Facets of David Newman (Atlantic, 1969)
With Oliver Nelson
Afro/American Sketches (Prestige, 1961)
With Chico O'Farrill
Nine Flags (Impulse!, 1966)
With Oscar Peterson
Bursting Out with the All-Star Big Band! (Verve, 1962)
With Oscar Pettiford
The New Oscar Pettiford Sextet (Debut, 1953)
 Oscar Pettiford (Bethlehem, 1954)
The Oscar Pettiford Orchestra in Hi-Fi (ABC-Paramount, 1956)
The Oscar Pettiford Orchestra in Hi-Fi Volume Two (ABC-Paramount, 1957)
With Johnny Richards
Experiments in Sound (Capitol, 1958)
The Rites of Diablo (Roulette, 1958)
Walk Softly/Run Wild! (Coral, 1959)
With the Riverside Jazz Stars
A Jazz Version of Kean (Riverside, 1962)
With Pete Rugolo
Rugolomania (Columbia, 1955)
New Sounds by Pete Rugolo (Harmony, 1954–55, [1957])
With Pharoah Sanders
Karma (Impulse, 1969)
With George Shearing
Satin Brass (Capitol, 1959)
With Warren Smith
Composer's Workshop Ensemble (Strata-East, 1972)
With Les Spann
Gemini (Jazzland, 1961)
With Billy Taylor
Kwamina (Mercury, 1961)
With Clark Terry
Color Changes (Candid, 1960)
With McCoy Tyner
Song of the New World (Milestone, 1973)
With Randy Weston
Uhuru Afrika (Roulette, 1960)
Highlife (Colpix, 1963)
Tanjah (Polydor, 1973)
With Art Webb
Mr. Flute (Atlantic, 1977)
With Mary Lou Williams
Mary Lou's Mass (Mary, 1972 [1975])
With Phil Woods
Rights of Swing (Candid, 1961)

References

External links
[ All music]
Downbeat bio
Hornplanet's Jazz cafe
The Jazz Horn

1921 births
1977 deaths
Musicians from Detroit
American jazz horn players
Manhattan School of Music faculty
Blue Note Records artists
20th-century American musicians
Jazz musicians from Michigan
20th-century American male musicians
African-American jazz musicians
20th-century African-American musicians